Güneli is a village in the Nusaybin District of the Mardin Province of Turkey. The village is populated by Kurds of the Dasikan tribe and had a population of 22 in 2021. The village is Yazidi.

References 

Villages in Nusaybin District
Tur Abdin
Yazidi villages in Turkey
Kurdish settlements in Mardin Province